Jack Walker is an English professional rugby union player who plays as a hooker for Premiership Rugby club Harlequins. Prior to joining Bath, Walker played for Yorkshire Carnegie, he was the youngest forward to play for and, the youngest player to captain the club. Walker has played for the England age groups and was part of the teams which won the 2014 and 2016 Junior World Championships.

Early life
Walker was born in Steeton, West Yorkshire, his father played both Rugby Union and Rugby league. Walker attended Settle College and Prince Henry's Grammar School, he started playing at North Ribblesdale. Walker began playing at fly-half before being moved to the forwards. Walker was awarded the Jaguar Academy of Sport rising star in 2012.

Club career
Walker signed for Yorkshire Carnegie in 2013. He made his debut in October 2013 coming off the bench in a match against Bristol Bears at the age of 17 years and 160 days becoming the youngest forward to appear for Carnegie. Walker became the youngest captain of Carnegie in 2015 at the age of 18 years, 256 days.

In May 2016 it was announced that Walker had signed with Bath for the 2016/17 season. He came off the bench for the Bath side that lost to Exeter Chiefs in the final of the 2017–18 Anglo-Welsh Cup. In the summer of 2021 Walker joined Harlequins.

International career
Walker has represented the England age groups from U16-U20. He was a member of the team that won the 2014 IRB Junior World Championship and came off the bench in the final against South Africa at Eden Park. The following year saw Walker start all of the matches for England as they won the 2015 Six Nations Under 20s Championship and finished runners up to New Zealand in the 2015 World Rugby Under 20 Championship.

Walker was made captain of the side for the 2016 Six Nations Under 20s Championship and the subsequent 2016 World Rugby Under 20 Championship. He scored a try during the pool stage against Scotland but was unable to participate in the knockout phase of the tournament due to concussion. England won the final of the competition and Walker lifted the trophy alongside Harry Mallinder who had captained in his absence.

In June 2022 Walker received his first call-up to the senior England squad by coach Eddie Jones. Walker was included in the squad for the 2023 Six Nations Championship by new coach Steve Borthwick. An unused substitute in the opening round defeat to Scotland, he made his debut in the next round on 12 February 2023 coming on as a second-half replacement for Jamie George in a victory against Italy at Twickenham.

Honours
England U20
 World Rugby Under 20 Championship: 2014, 2016
 Six Nations Under 20s Championship: 2015

Bath
 Anglo-Welsh Cup runner up: 2017–18

Individual
 2012 Jaguar Academy of Sport Rising Star

References

External links
 
  Jack Walker RFU Profile
  Jack Walker Harlequins Profile

1996 births
Living people
Bath Rugby players
English rugby union players
England international rugby union players
Harlequin F.C. players
Leeds Tykes players
Rugby union players from Bradford
Rugby union hookers